Platyceps is a genus of snakes of the family Colubridae endemic to Eurasia.

Taxonomy 
The genus was erected in 1860 by Edward Blyth, allying species previously described.

The genus name Platyceps was inadvertently used for a fossil species in 1877, now recognised as Platycepsion wilkinsoni.

Species
The following 30 species are recognized as being valid.
Platyceps afarensis Schätti & Ineich, 2004
Platyceps atayevi (Tuniyev & Shammakov, 1993)
Platyceps bholanathi (Sharma, 1976)
Platyceps brevis (Boulenger, 1895)
Platyceps collaris (F. Müller, 1878)
Platyceps elegantissimus (Günther, 1878)
Platyceps florulentus (I. Geoffroy Saint-Hilaire, 1827)
Platyceps gracilis 
Platyceps insulanus (Mertens, 1965)
Platyceps josephi Deepak, Narayanan, Mohapatra, Dutta, Melvinselvan, Khan, Mahlow & Tillack, 2021
Platyceps karelini (Brandt, 1838)
Platyceps ladacensis (Anderson, 1871)
Platyceps largeni (Schätti, 2001)
Platyceps messanai (Schätti & Lanza, 1989)
Platyceps najadum (Eichwald, 1831)
Platyceps noeli Schätti, Tillack & Kucharzewski, 2014
Platyceps plinii (Merrem, 1820)
Platyceps rhodorachis (Jan, 1865)
Platyceps rogersi 
Platyceps saharicus Schätti & McCarthy, 2004
Platyceps schmidtleri (Schätti & McCarthy, 2001)
Platyceps scortecci (Lanza, 1963)
Platyceps sinai (Schmidt & Marx, 1956)
Platyceps sindhensis Schätti, Tillack & Kucharzewski, 2014
Platyceps somalicus (Boulenger, 1896)
Platyceps taylori (Parker, 1949)
Platyceps thomasi (Parker, 1931)
Platyceps variabilis (Boulenger, 1905)
Platyceps ventromaculatus (Gray, 1834)
Platyceps vittacaudatus (Blyth, 1854)

Nota bene: A binomial authority in parentheses indicates that the species was originally described in a genus other than Platyceps.

References

Further reading
Blyth E (1860). "Report of Curator, Zoological Department". Journal of the Asiatic Society of Bengal 29 (1): 87–115. (Platyceps, new genus, p. 114).

 
Snake genera
Taxa named by Edward Blyth